Saïd Allik, (born April 24, 1948) in Tixeraïne, Birkhadem in Algeria, is an Algerian footballer turned trainer and then president of the USM Alger. He is appointed President of the Club Cr Belouzdad

Biography

Player career 
Said Allik has evolved during his playing career as a defender. He has worn the colors of USM Algiers, Hydra AC and USM El Harrach.

Management career

President of USM Alger
In 1994 Saïd Allik became Chairman of the Board of Directors of USM Alger and promised to return the team to Division 1, On May 26, 1995 USM Alger won away from home against MC Ouargla and achieved an promotion challenge back to the Division 1 after five full seasons, Allik announce that USM Alger has returned to its normal place and will not fall again to the second division, In the first season in Division 1 Allik won the first title in 33 years and the second in USM Alger history. Then, in the following season, Alik signed a contract with the JS Kabylie duo, Tarek Hadj Adlane the former player of Al Ittihad and Mahieddine Meftah the African Cup of Nations champion with Algeria national team and because of it a great enmity began between Allik and Mohand Chérif Hannachi. in the 1998–99 Algerian Cup Semi-finals against MC Alger, there was a great controversy over the way the game was played, where it was supposed to play from two games, but the Ministry of Youth and Sports decided to play the two games in Stade du 5 Juillet, Saïd Allik refused this insisting that each team plays in his stadium and Stade du 5 Juillet, he was the official stadium of MC Alger, after which the Minister of Youth and Sports Mohamed Aziz Derouaz rejected this request and insisted that he play on Stade du 5 Juillet for security reasons. On the day of the match, USM Alger went to Omar Hamadi Stadium and MC Alger and the referees to Stade du 5 Juillet. Minister of the Interior and Local Authorities at that time Abdelmalek Sellal called Allik to find a solution to this problem, His response was that there were two solutions the first is that each team plays in its stadium Or hold one game in a neutral stadium, and Allik proposes Stade du 19 Mai 1956 in Annaba, but because of the black decade and since both of them are from the capital, it was decided to hold it in Stade du 5 Juillet. in the 2000–01 Algerian Cup Semi-finals against JSM Skikda at Stade 20 Août 1955, the match is stopped in the 46th minute due to the invasion of the field by JSM Skikda supporters Where was advanced with the goal of Azzedine Rahim, After pressure from the country's higher authorities, Saïd Allik accepted the replay of the match, later the Algerian Football Federation decided to repeat the match in a neutral stadium at Stade des Frères Brakni.

From 2005 to 2010, the worst of Saïd Allik's period, where USM Alger's level declined and did not achieve any title and contented itself with playing the cup final twice against traditional rivals MC Alger and was defeated in both of them, their first final defeat since 1980. Al-Ittihad Most of its players retired or getting old. and continued to rely on them for more than a decade It is said that the biggest reason for this decline is the support of Saïd Allik for Ali Benflis in the presidential election against President Abdelaziz Bouteflika at the time. It was decided by the Ligue de Football Professionnel and the Algerian Football Federation to professionalize the Algerian football championship, starting from the 2010–11 season Thus all the Algerian football clubs which until then enjoyed the status of semi-professional club, will acquire the professional appointment this season. the president of the Algerian Football Federation, Mohamed Raouraoua, has been speaking since his inauguration as the federation's president in Professionalism, promising a new way of management based on rigor and seriousness, especially since football has bottomed out in recent seasons, due to the catastrophic management of the clubs which could not go and were lagging behind clubs in neighboring countries that have made extraordinary progress, becoming full-fledged professional clubs, which will enable them to increase their African continent, On August 4, 2010, USM Alger went public in conjunction with the professionalization of the domestic league. Algerian businessman Ali Haddad became the majority share owner after investing 700 million Algeria dinars to buy an 83% ownership in the club to become the first professional club in Algeria. On October 27, 2010, Haddad replaced Saïd Allik as president and owner of the club. Allik had been the club's president for the past 16 years.

CR Belouizdad sport director

On November 4, 2018, Madar Holding Company appointed Saïd Allik as the sporting director of CR Belouizdad, Given his experience Allik was able to end all the problems in the club and ensure that CR Belouizdad remains in Ligue 1 thanks to the financial stability provided by the company. Allik received great criticism from the supporters of USM Alger, the club, which was its president for 16 years and demanded him to resign from the presidency of the amateur club but he refused. With the outbreak of protests in Algeria and the impact of USM Alger after the imprisonment of the club’s owner Ali Haddad, the amateur club of USM Alger headed by Saïd Allik, began to intervene to pull the rug out from ETRHB Haddad company, something that the supporters who demanded him to resign from CR Belouizdad did not like in order to interfere in the club’s affairs and with the request of the Minister of Youth and Sports not to Combine two positions, Saïd Allik returned to his resignation from the SSPA CR Belouizdad in a recent statement. Allik indicated that he did not understand the latest changes that have been made to the organization chart of the Algerian club in recent months.

References

1948 births
Living people
Algerian footballers
Association football defenders
21st-century Algerian people